Richard Mark Bonnar (born 19 November 1968) is a Scottish actor. He is known for his roles as Max in Guilt, Duncan Hunter in Shetland, Bruno Jenkins in Casualty, Detective Finney in Psychoville, DCC Mike Dryden in Line of Duty, Colin Osborne in Unforgotten, Townsend in Battlefield 1 and  Field in Summer of Rockets.

Career 
On television, Bonnar has appeared as Peter Mayhew in BBC One's New Blood and Chris in the Channel 4 comedy Catastrophe, a role which he reprised in the following series. He also portrays the Rev. Adam Collingbourne in ITV's Home Fires, John Halliday in Undercover, as well as regular Duncan Hunter in Shetland for BBC One. Other television credits include Vera, Grantchester, Case Histories, The Paradise, Doctor Who, Psychoville, Taggart, Phoneshop and Paradox. In 2005, he portrayed regular Bruno Jenkins in the BBC One series Casualty. In 2018, he portrayed Dr Neil Sommer in the Channel 4 series Humans.

His theatre performances include Bosola in The Duchess of Malfi at the Old Vic, London in 2012, Philistines at the Lyttelton, National Theatre in May 2007, Phil in Mammals in a national tour in 2006, David in A Girl in a Car with a Man at the Jerwood Theatre Upstairs in December 2004, Benedick in Much Ado About Nothing at the Salisbury Playhouse in September 2004, Cyrano de Bergerac at the National Theatre in 2004 and Parade at the Donmar Warehouse in September 2007.

Bonnar provides the voice and motion capture of Edward "Blackbeard" Thatch in the 2013 video game Assassin's Creed IV: Black Flag. He also provides the voice and motion capture for Townsend in the 2016 game Battlefield 1. He also features in the Doctor Who series Doom Coalition from Big Finish Productions, where he portrays the Eleven, a villainous Time Lord who retains the personalities of his past incarnations in his mind.

Bonnar also voices Twigs and Box in the CBeebies series Tree Fu Tom.

Personal life 
Bonnar was born in Edinburgh to environmental artist Stan and his wife Rosi. Stan's job as town artist for the Scottish New Towns meant the family moved around and Mark spent his childhood in Stonehouse, South Lanarkshire, attending Townhead Primary School in Stonehouse. By 1981 the family had moved to Edinburgh and Mark attended Leith Academy. He married actress Lucy Gaskell on 28 December 2007. Their first child, Martha, was born in July 2011, and their second, Samuel, in June 2015. He now lives in Berkhamsted, Hertfordshire.

Filmography

Audio work

Awards and nominations

References

External links 
 

1968 births
Living people
20th-century Scottish male actors
21st-century Scottish male actors
Scottish male film actors
Scottish male radio actors
Scottish male television actors
Scottish male voice actors
Male actors from Edinburgh
People educated at Leith Academy